FC Spartak-Peresvet Bryansk was a Russian football team from Bryansk. It played professionally from 1996 to 1999. Their best result was 9th place in the Russian Second Division, Zone West in 1998.

Team name history
 1992–1993 FC Partizan Bryansk
 1994–1998 FC Spartak Bryansk
 1999 FC Spartak-Peresvet Bryansk

External links
  Team history at KLISF

Association football clubs established in 1992
Association football clubs disestablished in 2000
Defunct football clubs in Russia
Sport in Bryansk
1992 establishments in Russia
2000 disestablishments in Russia